Christian Waaler (born 7 December 1981) is a Norwegian bandy player who currently plays in Norway as a midfielder.  He was already an international player at the age of 19 and is a regular member of the Norwegian squad.

He is making an attempt to bring bandy to the Philippines.

Career
Waaler started his career in Røa IL. He has also played for Ullevål IL, Ljusdals BK, Røa IL, Stabæk IF, Hammarby IF, Sköndals IK, Sköndals IK/GT-76,  Høvik IF, Stabæk IF, Ready.

References

External links
 Christian Waaler at bandysidan

Norwegian bandy players
Expatriate bandy players in Sweden
1981 births
Living people
Ljusdals BK players
Hammarby IF Bandy players